This article lists the winners and nominees for the Black Reel Award for Television for Outstanding Supporting Actress, Comedy Series. This category was first introduced in 2017 and won by Jenifer Lewis for Black-ish. Lewis holds the record for most wins in this category with 3 (consecutively) and most nominations with 4.

Winners and nominees
Winners are listed first and highlighted in bold.

2010s

2020s

Superlatives

Programs with multiple awards

3 awards
 Black-ish

Performers with multiple awards

3 awards
 Jenifer Lewis (3 consecutive)

Programs with multiple nominations

8 nominations
 Black-ish

6 nominations
 Insecure

2 nominations
 A Black Lady Sketch Show
 Saturday Night Live
 Survivor's Remorse

Performers with multiple nominations

5 nominations
 Jenifer Lewis

4 nominations 
 Yvonne Orji

2 nominations
 Tichina Arnold
 Leslie Jones
 Marsai Martin
 Natasha Rothwell

Total awards by network
 ABC - 3
 HBO - 2

References

Black Reel Awards